Meridian Hills is a community in Washington Township, Marion County, Indiana, about six and a half miles north of downtown Indianapolis and slightly southwest of the neighboring community of Williams Creek. It had a population of 1,616 at the 2010 census.

History

Residential construction began in the town in the early 1920s and Meridian Hills Country Club opened in 1923; however, the town did not incorporate until 1937.  It has existed as an "included town" since 1970, when it was incorporated into Indianapolis as part of Unigov. It is part of Indianapolis, while still retaining a town government under IC 36-3-2-5.  The town has the authority to levy taxes and pass ordinances, as well as appointing town police officers.

Meridian Hills remains a wooded residential enclave for the wealthy and upper-middle class.

Geography
Meridian Hills is located at  (39.884040, -86.156487) along the White River.

Demographics

2010 census
As of the census of 2010, there were 1,616 people, 644 households, and 477 families living in the town. The racial makeup of the town was 95.9% White, 1.2% African American, 0.1% Native American, 1.1% Asian, 0.1% Pacific Islander, 0.4% from other races, and 1.2% from two or more races. Hispanic or Latino of any race were 1.7% of the population.

There were 644 households, of which 32.0% had children under the age of 18 living with them, 64.8% were married couples living together, 6.2% had a female householder with no husband present, 3.1% had a male householder with no wife present, and 25.9% were non-families. 20.8% of all households were made up of individuals, and 10.6% had someone living alone who was 65 years of age or older. The average household size was 2.51 and the average family size was 2.94.

The median age in the town was 47.8 years. 24.3% of residents were under the age of 18; 4.4% were between the ages of 18 and 24; 17.7% were from 25 to 44; 34.3% were from 45 to 64; and 19.3% were 65 years of age or older. The gender makeup of the town was 49.1% male and 50.9% female.

2000 census
As of the census of 2000, there were 1,713 people, 657 households, and 509 families living in the town. The racial makeup of the town was 97.02% White, 1.58% African American, 0.76% Asian, 0.12% Pacific Islander, 0.06% from other races, and 0.47% from two or more races. Hispanic or Latino of any race were 0.82% of the population.

There were 657 households, out of which 33.8% had children under the age of 18 living with them, 72.0% were married couples living together, 4.0% had a female householder with no husband present, and 22.5% were non-families. 19.0% of all households were made up of individuals, and 10.4% had someone living alone who was 65 years of age or older. The average household size was 2.61 and the average family size was 3.01.

In the town, the population was spread out, with 27.0% under the age of 18, 3.0% from 18 to 24, 21.8% from 25 to 44, 30.5% from 45 to 64, and 17.6% who were 65 years of age or older. The median age was 44 years. For every 100 females, there were 95.5 males. For every 100 females age 18 and over, there were 96.9 males.

The median income for a household in the town was $107,009, and the median income for a family was $114,458. Males had a median income of $79,557 versus $56,304 for females. The per capita income for the town was $59,829. None of the families and 0.2% of the population were living below the poverty line, including no under eighteens and none of those over 64.

References

External links

 Town of Meridian Hills, Indiana website

Towns in Marion County, Indiana
Towns in Indiana
Indianapolis metropolitan area
Populated places established in 1937
1937 establishments in Indiana